Sphenomorphus undulatus, the wavy-backed forest skink, is a species of skink found in Indonesia.

References

undulatus
Reptiles described in 1878
Taxa named by Wilhelm Peters
Taxa named by Giacomo Doria
Skinks of New Guinea